Time Further Out (subtitled Miró Reflections) is a jazz studio album by the Dave Brubeck Quartet released by Columbia Records in November 1961. It features the "classic" lineup of the quartet: pianist and leader Dave Brubeck, alto saxophonist Paul Desmond, bassist Eugene Wright, and drummer Joe Morello. The album was recorded by engineer Fred Plaut and produced by Teo Macero.

Overview
Time Further Out continues the Quartet's exploration of unusual time signatures that began on their 1959 album Time Out. The time signature of each song is listed on the cover of the album (where they are referred to as "tempos").

Cover art
Echoing its predecessor Time Out (whose cover featured a painting by S. Neil Fujita), Time Further Out also features a piece of abstract modern art on its cover, this time by the surrealist Catalan-Spanish artist Joan Miró. The work depicted on the cover is Miró's 1925 painting Calculation. In his liner notes, Brubeck says the album is a "jazz interpretation" of the painting, and was conceived as a "blues suite".

Track listing
All pieces composed by Dave Brubeck.

"It's a Raggy Waltz" – 5:12
"Bluette" – 5:21
"Charles Matthew Hallelujah" – 2:52
"Far More Blue" – 4:38
"Far More Drums" – 4:00
"Maori Blues" – 3:54
"Unsquare Dance" – 2:00
"Bru's Boogie Woogie" – 2:28
"Blue Shadows in the Street" – 6:35

The 1996 CD reissue adds the following tracks:
"Slow and Easy (A.K.A. Lawless Mike)" – 3:29
"It's a Raggy Waltz"  (recorded live at Carnegie Hall in 1963) – 6:37

Charts
In the United States, the album peaked at #8 on the Billboard 200. On the Billboard Hot 100 singles chart, "Unsquare Dance" peaked at #74.

Personnel
Dave Brubeck – piano
Paul Desmond – alto saxophone
Eugene Wright – double bass
Joe Morello – drums

References

Dave Brubeck albums
1961 albums
Albums produced by Teo Macero
Cool jazz albums
Columbia Records albums
Legacy Recordings albums